Caille, the French for quail (plural: Cailles), may refer to:

People
 Honoré Caille du Fourny (1630–1713), French genealogist
 Juan Cailles (1871–1951), Filipino commander
 Niall Caille (died 846), High King of Ireland
 Nicolas-Louis de Lacaille (1713–1762), French astronomer
 André Caillé (born 1943), Canadian electricity company executive
 Alain Caillé (born 1944), French sociologist and economist
 Gisèle Caille, former French racing cyclist
 Stefano Caille (born 2000), French professional footballer 
 Florence Loiret Caille (born 1975), French actress

Places
 Caille, Alpes-Maritimes, a commune in southeastern France
 Caille Island, a small islet between Grenada and Carriacou in the Grenadines
 Allonzier-la-Caille, a commune in the Haute-Savoie department in south-eastern France
 Boissy-aux-Cailles, a commune in the Seine-et-Marne department in the Île-de-France region
 Butte-aux-Cailles, a neighbourhood of Paris, France
 La Caille (crater),  a lunar crater

See also
 Pierre Caille (disambiguation)